Gerald Theron Campion (23 April 1921 – 9 July 2002) was an English actor. He is best remembered for his role as Billy Bunter in a 1950s television adaptation (Billy Bunter of Greyfriars School) of books by Frank Richards (Charles Hamilton).

Biography

His father Cyril Theron Campion (1894–1961) – a playwright and screenwriter – and Blanche Louise Tunstall née Bear (1890–1933) – a first cousin of Charlie Chaplin – married in 1920 in London. Campion was born in Bloomsbury, London, an only child.

He won a place at RADA at age 15, and appeared in numerous films and television programmes – mostly comedies. In 1937, he appeared in Tavs Neiiendam's radio play Inspiration to a Poet on the BBC Home Service.

His only major success was as Bunter, a juvenile role he played successfully despite being much older than his character (he was 40 when the series ended). Campion later reprised the role (now Lord Bunter of Hove, who had succeeded in betting shops and property) in the BBC Radio 7 series Whatever Happened to ...? in the episode that speculated on whether Bunter's form master at Greyfriars School, Horace Henry Samuel Quelch, became a secret agent.

In 1979, he recorded an appearance in Shada, a Doctor Who story which was not completed in its intended form.

After dropping out of acting, Campion ran clubs and restaurants in London's Soho, the best known of which is Gerry's, a long running private members' club attracting a mainly theatrical membership.

Personal life

Campion's first marriage, with Jean M Sherman (Simmonds) (b. 1925) in London in 1947, ended in divorce in 1972. They had three children: Anthea (a singer who married composer Thomas Rajna); Anthony, born in 1948; and Angelica, born in 1962. His second marriage, with Susan (Suzie) Marks in 1973, ended with his death.

Campion lived in Wittersham, Kent for many years.  He and his wife Suzie moved to France in 1991.  He died in 2002 aged 81 in Agen, Aquitaine, France.

Selected filmography

 The Drum (1938) – Soldier (uncredited)
 The Ghost of St. Michael's (1941) – Pupil at Rear of Class (uncredited)
 Take My Life (1947) – Newspaper Seller at Station (uncredited)
 Miranda (1948) – Lift Boy (uncredited)
 The Pickwick Papers (1952) – Joe, the Fat Boy
 Top of the Form (1953) – Pugley
 Knave of Hearts (1954) – Harry (uncredited)
 Up to His Neck (1954) – Skinny
 Fun at St. Fanny's (1956) – Fatty Gilbert
 Jumping for Joy (1956) – Man with Ice Cream (uncredited)
 Keep It Clean (1956) – Rasher
 Carry On Sergeant (1958) – Andy Galloway
 Inn for Trouble (1960) – George
 School for Scoundrels (1960) – Proudfoot
 Double Bunk (1961) – Charlie
 Jigsaw (1962) – Glazier (uncredited)
 The Fast Lady (1962) – Actor in Scottish TV show
 A Home of Your Own (1964)
 The Comedy Man (1964) – Gerry
 Those Magnificent Men in their Flying Machines (1965) – Fireman (uncredited)
 The Sandwich Man (1966) – Fred – Sandwich Man in Suit of Armour
 The Sorcerers (1967) – Customer in China Shop
 Half a Sixpence (1967) – Fat Boy
 Chitty Chitty Bang Bang (1968) – Minister
 Atlantic Wall (1970) – Clergyman 2
 The Six Napoleons from The Return of Sherlock Holmes (1986) – Morse Hudson
 Little Dorrit (1987) – Mr. Tetterby
 Just Ask for Diamond (1988) – Uncle Holly

References

Sources

External links
 

1921 births
2002 deaths
Alumni of RADA
English male stage actors
English male film actors
English male television actors
People educated at University College School
People from Bloomsbury
People from Wittersham